Abdelilah Benkirane (born 2 April 1954) is a Moroccan politician who was Prime Minister of Morocco from November 2011 to March 2017. After having won a plurality of seats in the 2011 parliamentary election, his party, the moderate Islamist Justice and Development Party formed a coalition with three parties that had been part of previous governments.

Political career
During the 1970s, Benkirane was a leftist and Islamist political activist. He has represented Salé in the Moroccan parliament since 14 November 1997. He was elected leader of the Justice and Development Party in July 2008, taking over from Saadeddine Othmani.

Benkirane's politics are democratic and Islamist. In a 2011 interview he said: "If I get into government, it won't be so I can tell young women how many centimeters of skirt they should wear to cover their legs. That's none of my business. It is not possible, in any case, for anyone to threaten the cause of civil liberties in Morocco". However, he has in the past described secularism as "a dangerous concept for Morocco", and in 2010 he campaigned, unsuccessfully, to ban a performance in Rabat by Elton John because it "promoted homosexuality".

Prime Minister of Morocco 
Benkirane became Prime Minister on 29 November 2011. His government targeted average economic growth of 5.5 percent a year during its four-year mandate, and aimed to reduce the jobless rate to 8 percent by the end of 2016 from 9.1 percent at the start of 2012. Benkirane's government also actively pursued Morocco's ties with the European Union, its chief trade partner, as well as becoming increasingly engaged with the six-member Gulf Co-operation Council.

On 10 October 2016, Bankirane was reappointed after the Islamist party won parliamentary elections.

On 1 December 2016, Benkirane criticized the Syrian government of Bashar al-Assad for its actions during the Syrian Civil War: "What the Syrian regime backed by Russia is doing to the Syrian people surpasses all humanitarian limits".

The Justice and Development Party retained the majority of seats in the 2016 Moroccan general election. However, Benkirane was unable to form a functioning government due to ongoing political negotiations. On 15 March 2017, after five months of post-election deadlock, King Mohammed VI ousted Benkirane as Prime Minister and said he would choose another leader from the Justice and Development Party. On 17 March 2017 the king chose Saadeddine Othmani to replace Benkirane as Prime Minister.

Post-tenure 
On 12 April 2017, Abdelilah Benkirane resigned from the Moroccan Parliament claiming incompatibility. However, many in the media accused him of buying time in order to avoid showing his positions towards the newly appointed head of government, Saadeddine Othmani.

On 30 October 2021, Benkirane was elected as PJD secretary-general, following the resignation of Saadeddine Othmani in the aftermath of his party's loss in the 2021 Moroccan general election.

Personal life 
Born in Rabat, Benkirane's family are originally from Fes. His father was interested in Sufism and Islamic fundamentalism, while his mother attended meetings of the women's branch of Istiqlal.

Benkirane enjoys chess and music, although he says he is "not in favour of indecent music". His role model is his father, who died at the age of 90, when Benkirane was 16. He is married to a party activist and has six children. His youngest daughter is tetraplegic.

See also
Justice and Development Party

References

External links
Official website

|-

|-

|-

1954 births
Government ministers of Morocco
Justice and Development Party (Morocco) politicians
Living people
Moroccan Muslims
Moroccan educators
People from Rabat
Prime Ministers of Morocco